Barbara Ellen Gibson is a Canadian physiotherapist. In 2016, she was elected to the College of New Scholars, Artists, and Scientists of the Royal Society of Canada.

Early life and education
Gibson received her Bachelor of Medical Rehabilitation in Physical Therapy from the University of Manitoba in 1986 and her PhD in the Collaborative Programs in Bioethics and Health Care Technology and Place at the University of Toronto Faculty of Medicine (U of T).

Career
Following her formal education, Gibson joined the Department of Physical Therapy at U of T. In this role, she received a three-year Canadian Institutes of Health Research Operating Grant in 2012 for her project The Challenge Module for evaluating advanced motor skills of children with cerebral palsy: From measurement to child centred goal setting. She was later awarded a 2012 Faculty of Medicine Teaching Award for Excellence. As an associate professor in the Department of Physical Therapy and Senior Scientist at the Holland Bloorview Kids Rehabilitation Hospital, Gibson was appointed to the Bloorview Kids Foundation Chair in Childhood Disability Studies.

In 2016, Gibson published Rehabilitation: A Post Critical Approach  to re-examine the philosophical foundations of rehabilitation. Later that year, she was elected to the College of New Scholars, Artists, and Scientists of the Royal Society of Canada. Following her election, Gibson was promoted to the rank of Full Professor.

References

External links

Living people
Canadian physiotherapists
University of Manitoba alumni
University of Toronto alumni
Academic staff of the University of Toronto
Year of birth missing (living people)